, also , , or just  is a  andesitic stratovolcano on the border between Mori, Shikabe, and Nanae, all within the Oshima Subprefecture of Hokkaidō, Japan.

Occurrence of volcanic activity started some 30,000 years ago. Following roughly 5,000 years of dormancy, volcanic activity at Mount Koma-ga-take restarted at the start of the 17th century, triggering the Kan'ei Great Famine in 1640. Since then, there have been at least 50 recorded volcanic events at Mount Koma-ga-take.

References

 Geographical Survey Institute
 Teikoku's Complete Atlas of Japan, Teikoku Shoin Co., Ltd., Tokyo 1990,

External links
 
 Hokkaido-Komagatake - Japan Meteorological Agency 
  - Japan Meteorological Agency
 Hokkaido-Komagatake Volcano - Geological Survey of Japan
 Hokkaido-Komagatake - Smithsonian Institution: Global Volcanism Program

Volcanoes of Hokkaido
Mountains of Hokkaido
Pleistocene stratovolcanoes
Active volcanoes
Stratovolcanoes of Japan